The Western Union Junction Railroad Museum is a railroad museum in Sturtevant, Wisconsin, run by the Western Union Junction Railroad Museum, Inc.

It is located across the street from the original location of the Chicago, Milwaukee, St. Paul and Pacific Railroad (Milwaukee Road) depot, and near trackage of the Canadian Pacific Railway.

The equipment owned by the museum includes three Milwaukee Road Boxcars, a Milwaukee Road Caboose, a MT14 Fairmont Speeder work train, and several old signals.

References

External links
 Western Union Junction Railroad Club, Inc. - Facebook page

Railroad museums in Wisconsin
Museums in Racine County, Wisconsin
1992 establishments in Wisconsin